Planets Conspire is a 2006 album by The Meligrove Band. Released January 17, 2006 in Canada, Planets Conspire is their third studio album, and their first with V2 Records (the Canadian vinyl edition was released by indie label We Are Busy Bodies). The album features Jason Nunes on vocals, piano, guitar and organ, Andrew Scott on guitar, organ and brass, Michael Small on bass and Darcy Rego on drums and acoustic guitar.

Planets Conspire was featured as Rough Trade Shops' Album of the Month in April 2006, and in Canada it reached #2 on the national campus radio chart.

The album was remastered and reissued as a double vinyl LP in November 2017.

Track listing 
All songs written by Jason Nunes, except where noted.

Side A 
"Isle of Yew" – 3:38
"Planets Conspire" – 3:52
"Grasshoppers in Honey" – 3:48
"Everyone's a Winner" – 3:37
"Feversleep" – 1:07

Side B 
"Ages & Stages" – 2:14
"Our Love Will Make the World Go Round" – 3:21
"I'm Easy" (Nunes, Darcy Rego) – 4:09
"Free on the Air" (Rego) – 2:41
"You're Alive" – 4:12
"Delivered from All Blindness of Heart" – 4:34

Personnel

Band 
 Jason Nunes - vocals, guitar, piano, organ
 Darcy Rego - vocals, drums, acoustic guitar
 Andrew Scott - guitar, organ, horns
 Michael Small - bass guitar, vocals

Guests 
 Matt Beckett - whistling
 José Contreras - additional sounds
 Lily Frost - vocals
 Randy Lee - strings
 Yoroku Saki - synthesizer
 Drew Smith - guitar
 Jessie Stein - vocals
 Davina Thomson - clarinet

Release history 
 January 17, 2006 - Canada
 August 14, 2006 - United Kingdom
 October 11, 2006 - Scandinavia and Finland

References 

2006 albums
The Meligrove Band albums
V2 Records albums